Sandown Platform was a railway station in the then-industrial suburb of Camellia in Sydney, Australia, which opened 24 October 1892. The station was situated on the Sandown railway line adjacent to the Parramatta River and was the location for a container terminal as well as a refinery tanker loading facility. It was the terminus for electric train services on the Sandown line which commenced 10 August 1959.

Passenger services for the Abattoirs line were operated by CPH railmotors operating from Sandown via Lidcombe until November 1984. Passenger services to Sandown ceased on 19 December 1991. The Sandown line officially closed on 1 July 2019, with a section of the corridor set aside for use as part of the Parramatta Light Rail.

A signal box, the Steel Plate loading platform and sidings belonging to the refinery were located beyond Sandown. A siding branched off the line just before the platform.

Neighbouring stations 
Cream Of Tartar Works Platform, which was located up from Sandown Platform, closed in July 1959.

See also 

Clyde Refinery

References 

Disused railway stations in Sydney
Railway stations in Australia opened in 1892
Railway stations closed in 1991
1991 disestablishments in Australia